Cheverus High School (simply referred to as Cheverus, formerly The Catholic Institute High School) is a private, Jesuit, co-educational, college-preparatory school in Portland, Maine, United States. It was established in 1917 and is located in the Roman Catholic Diocese of Portland. It is named after Jean-Louis Lefebvre de Cheverus, the first Bishop of Boston.

History 
Cheverus High School was established in 1917 as The Catholic Institute High School and renamed Cheverus Classical High School in 1925, after Jean-Louis Lefebvre de Cheverus, the first Bishop of Boston. It was initially located on Free Street, moved to Cumberland Avenue in 1946, and then to its present location on Ocean Avenue in 1952. The school was originally run by the diocesan clergy and the Society of Jesus took over responsibility in 1942.

In 1998, nine male alumni claimed that they had been molested while attending the school. Two former faculty members were accused. The school confirmed the abuse and apologized to the victims. The victims also accused both the school and the Portland Diocese of hiding information, and that they had previously known about the abuse. Settlements to victims have reached a cumulative seven figures, with ongoing counseling additional.

Academics 
Cheverus offers 12 Advanced Placement classes, and has an honors option for most of its courses. Students must take 25.5 courses in 4 years, including at least 4 mathematics courses, 4 English courses, 4 theology courses, 3 science courses, 3 foreign language courses (continuing within the same language), and 3 social studies courses.

Notable alumni 

 Joseph E. Brennan, lawyer and politician
 Ian Crocker, swimmer
 John Joubert, serial killer
 Dick Joyce, MLB player
 Charles J. Loring Jr., fighter pilot

Notable faculty 
 Rodney S. Quinn, politician
 John McLaughlin, television personality and political commentator
 James Talbot, rapist

References

External links 

 

 
Schools in Portland, Maine
Roman Catholic Diocese of Portland
Catholic secondary schools in Maine
Jesuit high schools in the United States
Catholic Church sexual abuse scandals in the United States
Educational institutions established in 1917
1917 establishments in Maine
Sexual abuse scandal in the Society of Jesus